Qazi Mullah (Russian: Кази-Мулла, Kazi-Mulla, 1793–1832) was an Islamic scholar and ascetic, who was the first Imam of the Caucasian Imamate (from 1828 to 1832). He was a staunch ally of Imam Shamil. He promoted the Sacred Law of Sharia, spiritual purification (tasawwuf), and facilitated a jihad against the invading Russians. He was also one of the prime supporters of Muridism, a strict obedience to Koranic laws used by imams to increase religio-patriotic fervor in the Caucasus.

Early life
He was a close friend of Imam Shamil during his childhood in Dagestan. They both studied the Koran and Sufism together at Yaraghal, a Murid centre, and both disliked the loose customs of the mountain people that contradicted the laws in Koran. His mentor was Mullah Mohammed Yaraghi, a Naqshbandi Sufi scholar that brought the Mullah into the ulema.

He preached that Jihad would not occur until the Caucasians followed sharia completely rather than following a mixture of sharia and adat (customary traditions). By 1828, Mullah began proselytizing and claiming that obeying sharia, giving zakat, prayer, and hajj would not be accepted by Allah if the Russians were still present in the area. He even went on to claim that marriages would become void and children bastards if any Russians were still in the Caucasus.

Qazi Mullah became one of the most prominent preachers of Islam in the Caucasus. His memorization of over four hundred ahadith allowed him to win many debates against rival preachers in the area. As his reputation grew, he was invited by many khanates and kingdoms loyal, indifferent, and hostile to the Czar. As a sign of humility and austerity, he refused to ride, but would walk.

Popularity, reception, and rise 
During the early to mid 19th century Russian political strategy in Dagestan included supporting local, indigenous law, known as ‘adat. This was a careful and strategic investment against the growing religiosity and resistance founded on sharia law, which was championed by Ghazi Muhammad. The popularity and rise of Ghazi Muhammad has been attributed both to his charismatic personality and to an indigenous Dagestani population that had grown tired of Russian intrusion and reorganization of local land and resources. Due to conflicting local political, legal, and religious interests, the war led by Ghazi Muhammad has been characterized as a war in the name of Muslim resistance just as much as a war against Russian Imperial encroachment into the North Caucasus. While Ghazi Muhammad gained popular support for his religious policies and military tactics, he did not find widespread support among the region's other political leaders and indeed launched assaults both against local leaders who preferred to ascribe to ‘adat and against the encroaching Russians. As such, support for Ghazi Muhammad was not ubiquitous in Dagestan and his rise to power resulted in unrest among local political stakeholders.

Holy war

(For military details see Murid War.) In 1829, he was proclaimed imam in Ghimry, where he formally made the call for a holy war. He also decreed that all wine should be destroyed publicly. In 1830, Qazi Mullah and Shamil unsuccessfully tried to capture the Avar capital of Khunzakh from the khanum Pakkou-Bekkhe. Following the setback, Shamil prevailed upon him to bide his time for a while, until all the tribes became united in following sharia law. In 1831, after a few months of quiet, he attacked Northern Dagestan, and met with success there. His guerilla tactics caught the Russians unprepared. By 1832 he was able to menace Vladikavkaz, however, the Russians repulsed the Mullah's assault, and when they took Ghimry, according to legend, they found 

The Russians took his body to Tarku, the capital of the Kumyk state, and gave it to the Kumyk Khan, who had been loyal to them. The body was displayed in the marketplace for a few days, before being buried in the hills.

Song 
A posthumous song was composed for him, "Хьэтхым и къуэ кlасым Мыхьэмэт и уэрэд", Song for Qazi Mohamed.

References
 The Russian empire: historical and descriptive.John Geddie. Oxford University, 1882
Caucasus Mountain Men and Holy Wars. Nicholas Griffin. Thomas Dunne Books, 2003. 
The Shade of Swords: Jihad and the Conflict Between Islam and Christianity. Akbar, M.J. Routledge, 2003. 
The Sabres of paradise Lesley Blanch. Carroll & Graf, 1984. 
 Kaziev, Shapi. Imam Shamil. "Molodaya Gvardiya" publishers. Moscow, 2001, 2003, 2006, 2010

Notes

1832 deaths
Avar people
19th-century Islamic religious leaders
People of the Caucasian War
Muslims from the Russian Empire
North Caucasian independence activists